The Rockefeller Republicans were members of the Republican Party (GOP) in the 1930s–1970s who held moderate-to-liberal views on domestic issues, similar to those of Nelson Rockefeller, Governor of New York (1959–1973) and Vice President of the United States (1974–1977). Rockefeller Republicans were most common in the Northeast and industrial Midwestern states, with their larger moderate-to-liberal constituencies, while they were rare in the South and West.

The term refers to "[a] member of the Republican Party holding views likened to those of Nelson Rockefeller; a moderate or liberal Republican". —Geoffrey Kabaservice states that they were part of a separate political ideology, aligning on certain issues and policies with liberals, while on others with conservatives and on many with neither. Luke Phillips has also stated that the Rockefeller Republicans represent the continuation of the Whig tradition of American politics.

Rockefeller Republicanism has been described as the last phase of the "Eastern Establishment" of the GOP that had been led by New York governor Thomas E. Dewey. The group's powerful role in the GOP came under heavy attack during the 1964 primary campaign between Rockefeller and Barry Goldwater. At a point before the California primary, political operative Stuart Spencer called on Rockefeller to "summon that fabled nexus of money, influence, and condescension known as the Eastern Establishment". Rockefeller replied, "You are looking at it, buddy, I am all that is left".

Michael Lind contends that the ascendancy of the more conservative fusionist wing of the Republican Party, beginning in the 1960s with Goldwater and culminating in the Reagan Revolution in 1980, prevented the establishment of a Disraelian one-nation conservatism in the United States. The phrase "Rockefeller Republican" has come to be used in a pejorative sense by modern conservatives, who use it to deride those in the Republican Party that are perceived to have views which are too liberal, especially on major social issues. The term was adopted mostly because of Nelson Rockefeller's vocal support of civil rights and lavish spending policies. Historian Justin P. Coffey has stated that Rockefeller's liberalism is a myth, with former Vice President Spiro Agnew pointing out that the reality was quite different, stating: "A lot of people considered Rockefeller very liberal and very dovish on foreign policy, but he was not. He was harder than Nixon, and a lot more hawkish about the mission of America in the world."

On a national level, the last significant candidate for president from the liberal wing of the party was John B. Anderson, who ran as an independent in 1980 and garnered 6.6% of the popular vote. Locally, especially in the Northeast, liberal Republican officeholders have continued to win elections, including Bill Weld and Charlie Baker of Massachusetts, Phil Scott of Vermont, and Larry Hogan of Maryland.

Political positions 
In domestic policy, Rockefeller Republicans were typically center to center-right economically, however they vehemently rejected conservatives like Barry Goldwater and their laissez faire economic policies while holding beliefs in social policies that were often culturally liberal. They typically favored a social safety net and a continuation of New Deal programs but sought to run these programs more efficiently than the Democrats. Rockefeller Republicans opposed socialism and government ownership, and were strong supporters of big business and Wall Street, although they supported some regulation of business; rather than increasing regulation of business, they advocated for developing a mutually beneficial relationship between public interests and private enterprise, drawing comparisons and similarities to the French dirigisme or the Japanese developmental state. They espoused government and private investments in environmentalism, healthcare, and higher education as necessities for a better society and economic growth in the tradition of Rockefeller. They were strong supporters of state colleges, trade schools, and universities with low tuition and large research budgets, and also favored investments in infrastructure such as highway projects. Many supported the idea of a national health insurance program, with Nelson Rockefeller himself describing healthcare "a basic human right". President Eisenhower during his first term, tried to reform healthcare and implement expanded health insurance coverage. In the 1970s, Richard Nixon also tried to enact universal health insurance with the Comprehensive Health Insurance Plan(CHIP) Act.

Reflecting Nelson Rockefeller's tradition of technocratic problem solving, most Rockefeller Republicans were known to have a pragmatic and interdisciplinary approach to problem solving and governance while advocating for a broad consensus rather than a consolidation of support. Also welcoming an increased public role for engineers, doctors, scientists, economists, and businessmen over politicians in crafting policies and programs. As a result, many Rockefeller Republicans were major figures in business, such as auto executive George W. Romney and investment banker C. Douglas Dillon. In fiscal policy, they favored balanced budgets and were not averse to raising taxes in order to achieve them. Connecticut Senator Prescott Bush once called for Congress to "raise the required revenues by approving whatever levels of taxation may be necessary". Rockefeller Republicans differed on spending, with Nelson Rockefeller himself described as a big spender and Thomas Dewey noted for being more fiscally prudent.

A critical element was their support for labor unions and especially the building trades appreciated the heavy spending on infrastructure. In turn, the unions gave these politicians enough support to overcome the anti-union rural element in the Republican Party. As the unions weakened after the 1970s, so too did the need for Republicans to cooperate with them. This transformation played into the hands of the more conservative Republicans, who did not want to collaborate with labor unions in the first place and now no longer needed to do so to carry statewide elections.

In foreign policy, they tended to be Hamiltonian, espousing internationalist and realist policies, supporting the United Nations and promoting American business interests abroad. Most wanted to use American power in cooperation with allies to fight against the spread of Communism and help American business expand abroad.

History

Origins 
The two major political parties throughout American history had been coalitions of interest groups rather than ideological vehicles. As recently as the 1960s, the Republican Party had contained large numbers of moderate and even liberal representatives. Geoffrey Kabaservice states that the form of conservatism which is now equated to the Republican party did not even exist until the 1950s, and remained a minority faction for many years afterward. In 1854, several disparate groups coalesced together to form the Republicans party. Many were former members of the Whig Party, abolitionists and Northern industrialists and financiers. The Whigs had advocated an economic program known as the American System which called for an activist government especially in the construction of national infrastructure or "internal improvements", and support for a national bank. The Rockefeller Republican lineage can be traced back to this tradition of a more activist and reformist federal government.

Aftermath of the New Deal 
The impact of the great depression upended the party coalitions and voting blocs leading to the New Deal Coalition and subsequent electoral dominance of the Democratic Party. The success of the New Deal and Franklin Delano Roosevelt's popularity during World War II meant that the Republican Party suffered several major electoral defeats and had became the minority party in congress. Thomas E. Dewey, the Governor of New York from 1943 to 1954 and the Republican presidential nominee in 1944 and 1948, believed that the Republican party could not survive if it repealed the policies implemented during the Depression to assure economic security for the average family. As the leader of the moderate wing of the Republican Party in the 1940s and early 1950s, Dewey battled conservative Republicans from the Midwest led by Senator Robert A. Taft of Ohio, known as "Mr. Conservative". Although Taft did not oppose government intervention where he thought it was essential such as federal support for education and a minimum income for individuals and families.  

With the help of Dewey, General Dwight D. Eisenhower defeated Taft for the 1952 Republican primaries and became the presidential candidate of the Republican Party. Eisenhower coined the phrase "Modern Republicanism" to describe his moderate vision of Republicanism. After Eisenhower, Nelson Rockefeller, the Governor of New York, emerged as the leader of the moderate wing of the Republican Party, running for President in 1960, 1964 and 1968. Rockefeller Republicans suffered a crushing defeat in 1964 when conservatives captured control of the Republican Party and nominated Senator Barry Goldwater of Arizona for president.

Evolution 

Other prominent figures in the GOP's Rockefeller-wing included Connecticut Senator Prescott Bush, Pennsylvania Governor Raymond P. Shafer, Pennsylvania Senator Hugh Scott, Illinois Senator Charles H. Percy, Oregon Senator Mark Hatfield, Maine Senator Margaret Chase Smith, New York Senator Jacob Javits, Arkansas Governor Winthrop Rockefeller, Nelson's younger brother (who was somewhat of an aberration in the conservative, heavily Democratic South), Edward Brooke of Massachusetts, John Chafee of Rhode Island and Lowell Weicker of Connecticut. Some also include President Richard Nixon, who was influenced by this group. Although Nixon ran against Rockefeller from the right in the 1968 primaries and was widely identified with the cultural right of the time, he adopted several Rockefeller Republican policies during his time as President, such as setting up the Environmental Protection Agency, supporting expanded welfare programs, imposing wage and price controls and in 1971 announcing he was a Keynesian. The men had previously reached the so-called Treaty of Fifth Avenue during the presidential primaries of 1960, whereby Nixon and Rockefeller agreed to support certain policies for inclusion in the 1960 Republican Party Platform.

Opposition and decline 

Nelson Rockefeller was an influential voice within the Republican Party, but he never had the level of support of Goldwater or Nixon. However, even that level of influence began to decline with the election of Nixon to the presidency in 1968.

Their Democratic counterparts were the Blue Dog Democrats. On a number of issues, the Rockefeller Republicans and the Blue Dog Democrats agreed more with each other than they did with more extreme members of their own party.

Southern strategy 

It declined further, when Nixon's Southern strategy brought former Democratic voters in the Southern states over to the Republican side, and cemented those gains in 1972 and beyond. The term Rockefeller Republican was never appreciated from the conservative wing of the party, and as the voices of the Reagan right grew in the 1970s and eventually captured the presidency in 1980, it was looked down upon even more as a pejorative.

1960s and 1970s 

Barry Goldwater crusaded against the Rockefeller Republicans, beating Rockefeller narrowly in the California primary of 1964. That set the stage for a conservative resurgence, based in the South and West in opposition to the Northeast Rockefeller wing. However, the moderate contingent recaptured control of the party and nominated Richard Nixon in 1968. Easily reelected in 1972, Nixon was replaced as President upon his resignation by the moderately conservative Republican Gerald Ford. After Vice President Rockefeller left the national stage in 1976, this faction of the party was more often called "moderate Republicans" or Nixonians in contrast to the conservatives who rallied to Ronald Reagan. Four years after nearly toppling the incumbent Ford in the 1976 presidential primaries, conservative Ronald Reagan won the party's presidential nomination at the 1980 Republican National Convention and served two terms in the White House.

Reaganism and the Bushes 

During the 1980s, Barry Goldwater, a leading conservative, partly aligned with the  liberal side of the GOP due to his libertarian views on abortion and gay rights.

By 1988, the Republicans had chosen Prescott Bush's son George H. W. Bush as its presidential candidate on a conservative platform. Bush's national convention pledge to stave off new taxation were he elected president ("Read my lips: no new taxes!") marked the candidate's full conversion to the conservative movement and perhaps the political death knell for Rockefeller Republicanism as a prevailing force within party politics.

Social effects on decline 

Ethnic changes in the Northeast may have led to the demise of the Rockefeller Republican. Many Republican leaders associated with this title were White Anglo-Saxon Protestants like Charles Mathias of Maryland. Liberal New York Republican Senator Jacob Javits, who had an Americans for Democratic Action rating above 90% and an American Conservative Union rating below 10%, was Jewish. As time went on, the local Republican parties in the Northeast tended to nominate Catholic candidates who appealed to middle class social values-laden concerns, such as George Pataki, Rudy Giuliani, Al D'Amato, Rick Lazio, Tom Ridge, Chris Christie and others, who in many cases represented the party's diversity more on the basis of religion and were often otherwise like their Protestant conservative counterparts on policy.

With their power decreasing in the final decades of the 20th century, many moderate Republicans were replaced by conservative and moderate Democrats, such as those from the Blue Dog or New Democrat coalitions. Michael Lind contends that by the mid-1990s the liberalism of President Bill Clinton and the New Democrats were in many ways to the right of Eisenhower, Rockefeller, and John Lindsay, the Republican mayor of New York City in the late 1960s. In 2009, CNN published an analysis describing how liberal and moderate Republicans had declined by the start of the 21st century. In 2010, Scott Brown was elected to the Senate to fill the seat once held by Democratic Senator Edward Kennedy. He was considered to be a moderate Republican in a similar mold as Susan Collins and Olympia Snowe of Maine. However, by middle of the century's second decade, only Senator Susan Collins of Maine remained as a moderately liberal Republican representing New England at the federal level.

Tea Party 

In 2010, several moderate Republicans lost their primaries or were challenged by the Tea Party movement.  In Alaska, Senator Lisa Murkowski, the ranking member of the Energy and Natural Resources Committee, lost her GOP primary to conservative Tea Party challenger Joe Miller. The Tea Party's campaign organization "helped Miller portray the senator as too liberal for the state". Despite her primary defeat, Murkowski was reelected after waging a successful write-in campaign.

Mike Castle, a moderate former Governor and Representative of Delaware, lost his primary to conservative "insurgent" Christine O'Donnell, who depicted Castle as being too liberal. An op-ed of The Washington Post made the assertion that Castle's loss marked the end of the party legacy of Nelson Rockefeller.

Senator John McCain survived a primary in 2010, but his Tea Party opponent J. D. Hayworth accused him of being insufficiently conservative. A few years after, in 2014, the Arizona Republican Party censured McCain "for a record they called too 'liberal.

In upstate New York, GOP-nominated Dede Scozzafava was opposed by national conservatives within the Republican Party during her election bid for a congressional district: "National PACs upset with Scozzafava's support of the federal stimulus, EFCA, same-sex marriage and abortion rights poured on money and attacks". She was pressured to drop out of the race, and when she did the Republican National Committee endorsed Tea Party-backed Doug Hoffman.

2010s revival in the Northeast 

In 2014, moderate Republicans were elected governor of Maryland (Larry Hogan) and Massachusetts (Charlie Baker). In 2016, New Hampshire (Chris Sununu) and Vermont (Phil Scott) also elected moderates. According to an analysis by FiveThirtyEight and polling by Morning Consult, the quartet consistently rank among the most popular governors in the country. In 2018, Baker was re-elected by a 2:1 margin, receiving more votes than Elizabeth Warren, who was also running for re-election. The National Review wrote that year, "A kind of Rockefeller Republicanism seems to be rising once again in recent years" in New England and the Northeast.

Massachusetts Governor Charlie Baker "is socially liberal ... . He is pro-choice and has long supported gay marriage". In Vermont, the voters elected Phil Scott as Governor. Describing himself, Governor Scott stated: "I am very much a fiscal conservative. But not unlike most Republicans in the Northeast, I'm probably more on the left of center from a social standpoint. ... I am a pro–choice Republican." In 2017, The Washington Post described Larry Hogan, another Republican governor in a deep-blue state, as "a moderate Republican who is focused on jobs and the economy".

Modern usage 
The term "Rockefeller Republican" has become somewhat archaic since Nelson Rockefeller died in 1979. The Atlantic has referred to the election of Northeastern Republicans as being similar to "Rockefeller-style liberal Republicanism", even though the label is not necessarily used by the candidates themselves. The Rockefeller Republican label has sometimes been applied to modern politicians, such as Lincoln Chafee of Rhode Island, who served as a Republican in the Senate, was elected that state's governor as an independent, and later became a Democrat and briefly sought that party's 2016 presidential nomination. Some more conservative members of the Republican Party use the label in a derisive manner, along with other labels such as RINOs, i.e. Republicans in Name Only, or The Establishment.

Christine Todd Whitman, former Governor of New Jersey, referred to herself as a Rockefeller Republican in a speech on Governor Rockefeller at Dartmouth College in 2008. Lloyd Blankfein, Chairman and CEO of Goldman Sachs, who is a registered Democrat, referred to himself as a "Rockefeller Republican" in a CNBC interview in April 2012. The retired four-star generals Colin Powell and David Petraeus have both described themselves as "Rockefeller Republicans". Former Senator Olympia Snowe (R-Maine) and Senator Susan Collins (R-Maine) are also two notable moderate Republicans from the Northeast. Former Senator Scott Brown (R-Massachusetts), who ran a Senate campaign in New Hampshire, also had a voting record described as more liberal than most Republicans.

Senator John McCain was often referred to as a moderate during his 2000 and 2008 presidential campaigns by opponents and commentators alike. In the 2000 primary, Bush described the race as "going to be a clear race between a more moderate-to-liberal candidate vs. a conservative candidate in the state of South Carolina". NPR covered the 2008 campaign reporting that "some conservative Republicans say McCain's voting record shows him to be too moderate a GOP candidate". The BBC reported that this reputation as being more centrist was "for his relatively moderate views on civil unions, abortion and immigration reform". However, the Associated Press reported that voters' perceptions of McCain as a centrist was at odds with his voting record, which it described as "much more conservative than voters appear to realize." In 2004 and 2006, McCain was one of a few Republicans who voted against banning same-sex marriage at the federal level, arguing that the issue should be left to the states. However, he still supported efforts to ban gay marriage at the state level, supporting such efforts in Arizona in 2006 and California in 2008. FiveThirtyEight, which tracks and scores Congressional votes, had found that McCain had shifted between being more moderate and more conservative based on its study.

In 2012, the GOP nominated as their candidate for President Mitt Romney a Governor who had described himself as moderate and progressive in 2002. Running for Governor of Massachusetts, he said of himself: "I'm not a partisan Republican. ... I'm someone who is moderate, and ... my views are progressive." In his 1994 Senate campaign, Romney distanced himself from Ronald Reagan, noting that he was an independent during the Reagan presidency. One of his 2012 primary opponents, Newt Gingrich, even referred to Romney as a "Rockefeller Republican" in order to draw a contrast between Romney's former self-description and his own. However, in his own words during the 2012 campaign Romney described himself as a "severely conservative" Republican.

At the 1988 Republican National Convention, Donald Trump was asked by Larry King on CNN: "You might be classified as an Eastern Republican, Rockefeller Republican. Fair?", to which Trump replied: "I guess you can say that". During his 2016 presidential campaign, Trump was described as both a modern-day Rockefeller Republican (by some conservative writers) and as the heir to the Goldwaterite opposition to the Rockefeller Republicans.

In 2019, Bill Weld announced that he would consider a challenge to President Trump for the Republican nomination. Bill Weld has been described by The New York Times, in both his gubernatorial and presidential campaigns, as a moderate Republican. He has been likened to Rockefeller. Governor Weld is described as fiscally conservative and socially liberal. After declaring his candidacy, Weld described himself "the most pro-choice person" running for president.

Former officeholders

U.S. Presidents 
 Gerald Ford

U.S. Vice Presidents 
 Nelson Rockefeller

U.S. Senators
 Mark Andrews, (North Dakota)
 Edward Brooke, (Massachusetts)
 Clifford Case, (New Jersey)
 John Chafee, former Governor of Rhode Island and United States Senator
 Jacob Javits, (New York)
 Olympia Snowe, (Maine)
 Arlen Specter, (Pennsylvania)
 Ted Stevens, former U.S. Attorney, Solicitor of the Interior Department, United States Senator from Alaska & President pro tempore of the United States Senate
 John Warner, former Secretary of the Navy and United States Senator from Virginia
 Lowell Weicker, (Connecticut) (switched parties to A Connecticut Party, then became an Independent)

U.S. Representatives
 John Lindsay,  (New York and Mayor of New York City)
 George Wallhauser,  (New Jersey)

Governors
 William Cahill, former Governor of New Jersey
 Dan Evans, former Governor of Washington
 Tom Kean, former Governor of New Jersey
 Nelson Rockefeller, former Governor of New York
 William Scranton, former Governor of Pennsylvania
 Bill Weld, former Governor of Massachusetts (Changed parties to Libertarian, later reregistered as Republican)
 Lowell Weicker, former Governor of Connecticut (Former Republican and A Connecticut Party member)
 Larry Hogan, former Governor of Maryland.

 See also 

 Conservative Democrat (Blue Dogs)
 Country club Republican
 Factions in the Republican Party
 Libertarian Democrat
 New Democrats
 The New York Young Republican Club
 One-nation conservatism
 Red Tory
 Republican Main Street Partnership
 Republican In Name Only (RINO)
 New York Herald Tribune
 Ripon Society
 Roosevelt Republican
 South Park Republican

References
Informational notes

Citations

Bibliography
 
 
 
 
 
 
 
 
 
 
 
 
 
 
 

Further reading
 Barrett, Marsha E. (2022). "Defining Rockefeller Republicanism: Promise and Peril at the Edge of the Liberal Consensus, 1958–1975". Journal of Policy History 34(3): 336–370.
 Burns, James MacGregor. The Deadlock of Democracy. Englewood Cliffs, N.J.: 1967.
 Joyner, Conrad. The Republican Dilemma: Conservatism or Progressivism (1963).
 Kristol, Irving. "American Conservatism 1945–1995". Public Interest 94 (Fall 1995): 80–91.
 Perlstein, Rick. Before the Storm: Barry Goldwater and the Unmaking of the American Consensus (2001) text search, survey of GOP politics in 1960s.
 Reinhard, David W. The Republican Right since 1945 (1983).
 Rae, Nicol. Decline and Fall of the Liberal Republicans: 1952 to the Present. 1989.
 Reichley, A. James. Conservatives in an Age of Change: The Nixon and Ford Administrations. 1981.
 Reiter, Howard. "Intra-Party Cleavages in the United States Today". Western Political Quarterly 34 (1981): 287–300.
 Sherman, Janann. No Place for a Woman: A Life of Senator Margaret Chase Smith (2000).
 Smith, Richard Norton. On His: Terms: A Life of Nelson Rockefeller (2014), a major scholarly biography.
 Underwood, James F., and William J. Daniels. Governor Rockefeller in New York: The Apex of Pragmatic Liberalism in the United States (1982).

 External links 
 Republican Main Street Partnership – Republican group interested in building a pragmatic center in the GOP
 Progressive Republicans
 "Liberals Get the Action, Conservatives Get the Rhetoric" – first chapter of Nixon: The Man Behind the Mask'' by Gary Allen

Centrism in the United States
Factions in the Republican Party (United States)
Eponymous political ideologies
Nelson A. Rockefeller
Republican Party (United States) terminology